Sir Francis Godolphin (1540–1608) was an English politician, knight, and Member of Parliament.

Life

The nephew of Sir William Godolphin (1515–1570), who left no male issue, he succeeded to his uncle's estates early in Queen Elizabeth's reign. He was one of the leading citizens of Cornwall, described by that county's 17th-century historian, Richard Carew, as one "whose zeal in religion, uprightness in justice, providence in government, and plentiful housekeeping, have won him a very great and reverent reputation in his country". (The Survey of Cornwall, 1602, quoted in Burke's Extinct Peerage).

His father, Thomas, had been Governor of the Scilly Isles and they were leased to Francis who became governor in his turn (see Governors of Scilly). On royal instructions, he improved the defences of the islands which were, in Carew's words "reduced to a more defensible plight by him, who with his invention and purse, bettered his plot and allowance, and therein so tempered strength and delight, and both with use, as it serveth for a sure hold, and a commodious dwelling". 

Chief among this work of fortification was the building of Star Castle. He was also an innovative manager of Cornwall's tin mines, his inventions greatly increasing their productivity by extracting metal from material; that would previously have been discarded as refuse, so materially improving both the prosperity of Cornwall and the revenue that the Crown derived from it.

Sir Francis represented Cornwall in the Parliament of 1588–9 and Lostwithiel in that of 1593; he was also twice High Sheriff of Cornwall (1580 and 1604), Custos Rotulorum for a number of years, and Vice-Warden of the Stannaries from 1584 to 1603.

Family
Godolphin married Margaret Killigrew, daughter of Sir John Killigrew of Arwennack and the notorious pirate Mary Wolverston; and two of his sons, Sir William Godolphin (1567–1613) (his heir) and Sir Francis Godolphin (died 1640), followed him in becoming members of parliament. His daughter Thomasine married George Carew.

As a widower he married Alice Skerret (1545–1632) of Tavistock, Devon widow of Sir John Glanville (1542–1600)

In fiction
In the historical novel The Grove of Eagles, by Winston Graham, Godolphin is shown as a sympathetic figure. The main characters are the family of his first wife, the Killigrews: both out of family feeling and his concern for law and order, Godolphin warns them that their reputation for piracy and their general lawlessness will lead them into ruin.

Notes

Ancestry

References

 Burke's Extinct Peerage (London: Henry Colburn & Richard Bentley, 1831) 
'The Scilly Islands', Magna Britannia: volume 3: Cornwall (1814), pp. 330–337. 
D. Brunton & D. H. Pennington, Members of the Long Parliament (London: George Allen & Unwin, 1954)
 

|-

|-

|-

1540 births
1608 deaths
Members of the pre-1707 English Parliament for constituencies in Cornwall
17th-century English people
Politicians from Cornwall
Francis
High Sheriffs of Cornwall
English MPs 1589
English MPs 1593
Knights Bachelor
Governors of the Isles of Scilly